Sensors and Materials is a monthly peer-reviewed open access scientific journal covering all aspects of sensor technology, including materials science as applied to sensors. It is published by Myu Scientific Publishing and the editor-in-chief is Makoto Ishida (Toyohashi University of Technology). The journal was established in 1988 by a group of Japanese academics to promote the publication of research by Asian authors in English.

Abstracting and indexing
The journal is abstracted and indexed in:

According to the Journal Citation Reports, the journal has a 2019 impact factor of 0.599.

References

External links
 

English-language journals
Materials science journals
Monthly journals
Open access journals
Publications established in 1988